Loyola School and Pre-University College, Mundgod is a private Catholic primary and secondary school and pre-university college located in Mundgod, in the state of Karnataka, India. The institution is run by the Karnataka Jesuits.

History
Mundgod is one of the backward taluks of the Karwar area. The primary school was founded in 1991, the secondary school in 1994, and the composite pre-university college was established in 2004.

See also

 List of Jesuit schools
 List of schools in Karnataka
 Violence against Christians in India

References  

Jesuit secondary schools in India
Jesuit development centres
Jesuit primary schools in India
Christian schools in Karnataka
Pre University colleges in Karnataka
Schools in Uttara Kannada district
Educational institutions established in 1991
1991 establishments in Karnataka